Luo Zongxian (罗宗贤, born Baoding 1925 - 1968) was a Chinese composer. Among his best known works is the 1955 geju Caoyuan zhi ge.

References

1925 births
1968 deaths
Chinese classical composers
Chinese male classical composers
Chinese opera composers
Male opera composers
20th-century Chinese musicians
20th-century male musicians
20th-century classical composers